This is a list of secondary highways in Kenora District, most of which provide access to isolated and sparsely populated areas in the Kenora District of northwestern Ontario.

Highway 525 

Secondary Highway 525, commonly referred to as Highway 525, is a provincially maintained secondary highway in the Canadian province of Ontario. It is a remote secondary highway that links Highway 596 to the Wabaseemoong First Nations reserve. It is the second-westernmost secondary highway in the province, Highway 673 being the first. The route was commissioned by 1982 along what was formerly Highway 596; a former use of the route number existed between 1956 and 1973 in Gravenhurst.

Highway 594 

Secondary Highway594, commonly referred to as Highway594, is a provincially maintained secondary highway in the Canadian province of Ontario. The portion through Dryden, east of Gordon Road, is maintained under a Connecting Link agreement. Highway594 also serves to connect the northern end of Highway 502 with Highway17.

Highway 596 

Secondary Highway 596, commonly referred to as Highway 596, is a provincially maintained secondary highway in the Canadian province of Ontario. It connects the city of Kenora and the Trans-Canada Highway to Minaki, with a length of 48 kilometres. The highway was assigned in 1956.  The southern part of the highway used a former road from Kenora to Trout Lake.  The part from Pistol Lake to Minaki was originally part of a supply route for the construction of the White Dog Falls Station hydroelectric dam near the White Dog Reserve.  New road was built linking these two older segments.  The highway was substantially rebuilt and upgraded around 1980 as part of the Ontario Government's renovation of Minaki Lodge (since closed).

Termini and Intersections 
Northern terminus: The hamlet of Minaki, Ontario, shortly before a crossing with the Canadian National Railway's transcontinental line. West of Minaki, the highway crosses this railway line twice.
Southern terminus: Highway 17 in Kenora, Ontario.
Intersections
Kenora, ON
King's Highway 17, Trans-Canada Highway, Southern Terminus in Kenora
King's Highway 17A, Kenora Bypass
Kenora District
Provincial Secondary Highway 641
Trail, to Wade, Ontario
Provincial Secondary Highway 525, to White Dog Reserve
Undefined Rd 24, Northern terminus at Minaki, Ontario

Highway 601 

Secondary Highway601, commonly referred to as Highway601, is a secondary highway in the Canadian province of Ontario, located in Kenora District. The route loops north of Dryden, providing access to Dryden Regional Airport. The western terminus is at the Dryden city limits at the intersection of Leach Road, Theil Road and Colonization Avenue, from which it proceeds north along the latter. It loops around Beaver Lake and Zealand Lake, turns south, and passes the airport. The western terminus is at Highway 17 (the Trans-Canada Highway) east of Dryden. Highway601 was assumed on May9, 1956.

Highway 603 

Secondary Highway 603, commonly referred to as Highway 603, is a short secondary highway in the Canadian province of Ontario, located in Kenora District.

Highway 604 

Secondary Highway 604, commonly referred to as Highway 604, was a secondary highway in the Canadian province of Ontario, located in Kenora District. Its western terminus was Highway 17 in Kenora, and its eastern terminus was Highway 671,  past Kenora Airport. The highway was transferred to the town of Jaffray Melick on April 1, 1997, and the Connecting Link through Kenora removed.

Highway 605 

Secondary Highway605, commonly referred to as Highway605, is a secondary highway in the Canadian province of Ontario, located in Kenora District. The route begins at Highway 17 (the Trans-Canada Highway) at the hamlet of Oxdrift, west of Dryden. It travels north  and ends at a fork in the road near Rugby Lake. Highway605 was assumed on May9, 1956, and provides service to the dispersed rural community of Eton-Rugby.

Highway 609 

Secondary Highway 609, commonly referred to as Highway 609, is a  secondary highway in Kenora District in northwestern Ontario, Canada. The highway runs west from a junction with Ontario Highway 105 at the community of Red Lake Road to the community of Quibell, passing over the Wabigoon River at Quibell Dam, then heads north over the Canadian National Railway transcontinental main line onward to its terminus at Clay Lake. The road is paved from Highway 105 to Quibell, then gravel to its terminus at Clay Lake, and had an AADT traffic count in 2007 of 100 for its entire length.

Highway 618 

Secondary Highway 618, commonly referred to as Highway 618, is a provincially maintained secondary highway in the Canadian province of Ontario. It connects Olsen Mine and Madsen with the northern terminus of Highway 105 in the town of Red Lake. The  route was established in 1956, and has remained the same since then. It passes through a remote forested area, and encounters no communities of any significance outside of Red Lake.

Highway 641 

Secondary Highway 641, commonly referred to as Highway 641, is a secondary highway in Kenora District, Ontario, Canada. Its northern terminus at Ontario Highway 596, and its southern terminus is at Highway 17 in Kenora, just east of the junction of Highway 17 with the western end of the Kenora Bypass (Ontario Highway 17A). The highway passes under the Kenora Bypass and the Canadian Pacific Railway transcontinental main line, and travels through the settlement of Laclu. The highway had an AADT traffic count of 460 in 2016.

Highway 642 

Secondary Highway 642, commonly referred to as Highway 642, is a secondary highway in the Canadian province of Ontario. The western terminus is at the Ed Ariano Bypass on the eastern edge of Sioux Lookout; Highway 72 and Highway 516 share a common terminus at this intersection. The eastern terminus is at Highway 599 in Silver Dollar. The highway crosses the Marchington River and the Canadian National Railway transcontinental main line at the unincorporated place of Superior Junction.

Highway 646 

Secondary Highway 646, commonly referred to as Highway 646, was a secondary highway in the Canadian province of Ontario. It was the second-most northerly provincial highway in the entire network, surpassed only by Highway 599. It is no longer a secondary highway, and appears as Pickle Lake Road on road signs. The road travels through Pickle Lake, where it intersects Highway 599, and links Pickle Lake with the community of Pickle Crow to the east and the Pickle Lake Airport to the west.

Highway 647 

Secondary Highway 647, commonly referred to as Highway 647, is a secondary highway in the Canadian province of Ontario.  Its southeastern terminus is at Highway 17 at the west edge of the community of Vermilion Bay, and its northwestern terminus is at McIntosh Road at Blue Lake Provincial Park, a distance of  Beyond this point, the road continues as an unposted local road to the community of McIntosh and further to the Forest Lake Dam, providing access to cottages and resorts on the Indian Lake Chain.

Highway647 was assumed by the Department of Highways, predecessor to the modern Ministry of Transportation, on December30, 1963.

Highway 657 

Secondary Highway 657, commonly referred to as Highway 657, is a provincially maintained highway in the Canadian province of Ontario, located in Kenora District. The highway extends  from Highway 105 in the town of Ear Falls to the former Hudson Bay Company fur trading outpost at Goldpines, now home to several fishing and camping lodges.

The existing road to Goldpines was assumed as a provincial route by the Department of Highways, predecessor to the modern Ministry of Transportation, on November17, 1966.

Highway 658 

Secondary Highway 658, commonly referred to as Highway 658, is a provincially maintained secondary highway in the Canadian province of Ontario, located in Kenora District. The highway extends  between the city of Kenora and the community of Redditt. For a decade, Highway 658 was numbered as Highway 666, leading to numerous sign thefts and a petition by members of a church on the route. This petition eventually led to the route being renumbered in late 1985.

Highway 664 

Secondary Highway 664, commonly referred to as Highway 664, is a secondary highway in the Canadian province of Ontario. Located in Kenora District, the highway links the community of Hudson to Highway 72 near Sioux Lookout. In late July 2012, it was announced that the road would be renamed The Leo Bernier Memorial Highway, after the former MPP for Kenora and Minister of Northern Affairs.

History 
The highway began as a part of Highway 72 in 1934. In 1954, the road was renumbered as Highway 116, but may have been briefly designated as "Highway 72A" before that. By 1975, the Ministry of Transportation of Ontario had decided to demote three very lightly travelled Kings Highways in Northwestern Ontario to secondary highway status. Those roadways were Highway 116 (which became Highway 664), Highway 119 (which became Highway 665), and Highway 128 (which became the infamous Highway 666, and was consequently renumbered as Highway 658 in 1985.)

The road today is a typical secondary highway: lightly travelled, connecting a town to a main Kings Highway (Highway 72), and has slightly narrower and coarser pavement than Kings Highways.

Communities 
 Hudson
 Sam Lake

Highway 665 

Secondary Highway 665, commonly referred to as Highway 665, is a secondary highway in the Canadian province of Ontario. Located in Kenora District, the highway links the community of Richan to Highway 17 near Dryden.

The road was formerly a King's highway, with the designation of Highway 119, but was demoted to secondary highway status in 1975 along with two other routes in the Kenora District.

Highway 671 

Secondary Highway 671 is a highway 68.7 km (42.7 miles) in length. It stretches from the intersection with Jones Road to one of the East Indian Reserves near Grassy Narrows south to Kenora, Ontario terminating at Ontario Highway 17A (Kenora Bypass).

Highway 673 

Secondary Highway 673, commonly referred to as Highway 673, is one of the newest secondary highways in Ontario, and one of the newest of any provincially designated highway, having been constructed in 1993. The road is also Ontario's most westerly highway aside from Highway 17, which continues into nearby Manitoba. it is also one of the shortest secondary highways in the system.

The road starts at Highway 17, and provides access to the three Indian reserves on Shoal Lake (Shoal Lake #39, Shoal Lake #40, and Kejick First Nation).

References

External links 
 Route of Highway 603 on Google Maps
 Route of Highway 665 on Google Maps

 
Roads in Kenora District